Bohuslav "Woody" Vasulka  (born Bohuslav Vašulka (20 January 1937, Brno, Czechoslovakia – 20 December 2019, Santa Fe, USA)  was one of the early pioneer video artist known for his solo work and collaboration with Steina Vasulka, his wife. The VASULKAs, as they are sometimes called, were experimenting since early 1960s with images, video tapes, computer graphics and Digital Video Effecter (DVE), a technique that was important for television programmes.

Biography 
Bohuslav Vasulka studied engineering at the Industrial Engineering School of Brno between 1952 and 1956. Later, he discovered the potential that technology could bring to art and decided to move to Prague in 1960 and study television and film production at the Prague Academy for Performing Arts at the Faculty of Film and Television throughout the period from 1960 to 1965.  His educational background and engineering skills would later stimulate him to work in the realm of media art. In the early 1960s, Woody Vasulka met his future wife Steina Vasulka, Icelandic woman who was three years younger than him. At that time she was studying languages and violin playing at the conservatory in Prague, where she was granted a scholarship. They started working together and married in 1964. 

A year after they settled in New York, United States. The couple was in love with "America's boast of freedom, love of technology and promotion of independence". By that time, Woody Vasulka had filmed several documentaries and after relocating worked as an editor of industrial film projects at Harvey Lloyd Productions.

The Kitchen 
The Kitchen was founded by Woody and Steina Vasulka in 1971. It is one of New York City's oldest nonprofit spaces, where multidisciplinary artists working in the fields of dance, music, performance, media art can participate and exhibit their art pieces. There are also literary events, artists' talks and lecture series being reguralry held.

Works

Solo works 
 Vocabulary (fragment), 1974, video, 4'29'', LIMA collection.
 Reminiscence (2012), 1974, video, 4'52''.
 Reminiscence, 1974, video, 4'52''.
 The Matter, 1974, video, 4'02''.
 C-Trend, 1974, video, 8'29''.
 Electromagnetic Objects, 1975 - 2006, video 33'58''.
 Artifacts/Keysnow, 1980, video, 32'19''.
 Artifacts, 1980, video, 22'51''.
 The Commission, 1983, video, 39'16''.
 The Commission, 1983, video, 45'00''.
 Art of Memory, 1987, video, 36'37''.

Exhibitions

Solo exhibitions 
 1977 — Electronic Image in Film, Anthology Film Archive, New York (United States).
 1983 — The Commission, Rising Sun Media Center, Santa Fe (United States).
 1998 — Woody VASULKA, The Brotherhood: A Series of Six Interactive Media Constructions, NTT InterCommunication Center, Tokyo (Japan).
 1996 — A Retrospective Exhibition of Woody Vasulka's work, San Francisco Museum of Modern Art.
 1994 — Federal Exhibition Hall, Bonn (Germany).
 1994 — Lace Gallery, Los Angeles (United States).
 1992 — Woody Vasulka is preparing an exhibition dedicated to the pioneers of electronic art for the Ars Electronica festival in Linz (Eigenwelt der Apparatewelt: Pioneers of Electronic Art).
 1990 — Table 2: Automata (first in a series of six The Brotherhood installations), San Francisco (United States).
 1975 — The first group exhibition of the Vasulkas at the Albright-Knox Gallery in Buffalo (United States).

References

Further reading

Monographies 
 Vasulka, W.: The Brotherhood. A Series of Six Interactive Media Constructions, NTT InterCommunication Center, Tokyo, 1998.
 Vasulka, W., Vasulka, S. : machine media. — San Francisco : San Francisco Museum of Modern Art, 1996.
 Vasulka, W., Vasulka, S. : Interaktiivisen Taiteen Näyttely = Exhibition of the interactive art. — Helsinki : Nykytaiteen Museo ; Espoo : Galleria Otso, 1992 .
 Eizykman, Claudie, Vasulka, Steina; Vasulka, Woody – Steina et Woody Vasulka, vidéastes: 1969-1984: 15 années d'images électroniques, analogiques et numériques., Paris: : CINE-MBXA/CINEDOC, 1984.
 Vasulka, Woody: Descriptions. Buffalo, Albright-Knox Art Gallery, 1978.

1937 births
2019 deaths
Czech artists
Czechoslovak emigrants to the United States
People from Brno